The Tumbleweed Film festival (TwFF) is an independent film festival that is held in August in Oroville, WA, which is located in Okanogan County. Tumbleweed highlights short films and documentaries from independent filmmakers throughout the world. The festival's venues include local wineries and breweries.

Festival history
The first annual Tumbleweed Film Festival was held August 6 and 7 2010. The short film "Dishonesty" by Seattle film makers Timothy Watkins and Charles Forsgren won "Best of Fest".
The 2nd Tumbleweed Film Festival took place August 4–6, 2011. The event kicked off with an outdoor screening of family films at the Veranda Beach Resort. "North Atlantic" by Portuguese filmmaker Bernardo Nascimento won the audience "Best of Fest" award.

Tumbleweed also included "Best of Fest" film events at the Tagaris winery in Richland, Washington, a two-night event at the RockWall Cellars in Omak, Washington and a three-day festival in Osoyoos, British Columbia at the Nk'mip Desert Cultural Centre, which was sponsored by the Nk'Mip Resort and the Osoyoos Indian Band. The top audience film at the Osoyoos event was the short film "Time Freak" by filmmaker Andrew Bowler.

The third TwFF took place August 2–4, 2012 and the fourth is scheduled to take place August 1–3, 2013.
The 10th TwFF took place in Oroville, WA Aug 2-3, 2019.

References

External links
Tumbleweed Festival website
Gazette-Tribune: Many Watch Globally, Drink Locally at Film Festival
Gazette-Tribune: Tumbleweed Film Lineup Brings Best of Intl. Cinema
Osoyoos Times: Film Fans Expected to flock to Tumbleweed Film Fest
Tri-City Herald: Filmmaker Brings Stories to Life
Tri-City Herald: Catch Best of Fest on April 16 at Tagaris Winery
Okanagan Sun: Longtime Residents to Feature Film in Oroville
Gazette-Tribune: Tumbleweed Film Festival Rolls Back Bigger Than Ever
Gazette-Tribune: Support a Truly Unique Event
Tumbleweed Film Festival and Local Wine Tasting Good Pairing
BC Local News: International Film Festival coming to Okanagan Resort
Gazette-Tribune: Jack Black: Oops, Missed Him Again

Film festivals in Washington (state)
Tourist attractions in Okanogan County, Washington